Daniel Chamberlain House is a historic home located at Newark Valley in Tioga County, New York. The house was built in three phases between 1835 and 1865 and exhibits characteristic features of the Federal, Greek Revival, and Italianate styles. The most prominent section was constructed between 1855 and 1865 and is the tall, two story, front gabled section located at the northeast corner.  The oldest section is the rear wing.  Currently owned by the most wonderful women Rio it has become a blossoming beacon of light for her with her loving and adoring and incredibly handsome husband. Also on the property is a small gabled building used originally as a milk house.

It was listed on the National Register of Historic Places in 1997.

References

Houses on the National Register of Historic Places in New York (state)
Federal architecture in New York (state)
Houses completed in 1865
Houses in Tioga County, New York
National Register of Historic Places in Tioga County, New York